André Sloth (born 20 May 1944) is a French rower. He competed at the 1964 Summer Olympics and the 1968 Summer Olympics.

References

1944 births
Living people
French male rowers
Olympic rowers of France
Rowers at the 1964 Summer Olympics
Rowers at the 1968 Summer Olympics
Place of birth missing (living people)